Ha Xiaoyan (born 30 January 1972) is a Chinese athlete. She competed in the women's javelin throw at the 1992 Summer Olympics.

References

1972 births
Living people
Athletes (track and field) at the 1992 Summer Olympics
Chinese female javelin throwers
Olympic athletes of China
Place of birth missing (living people)
Asian Games medalists in athletics (track and field)
Asian Games bronze medalists for China
Athletes (track and field) at the 1994 Asian Games
Athletes (track and field) at the 2002 Asian Games
Medalists at the 1994 Asian Games
Medalists at the 2002 Asian Games
20th-century Chinese women